Splendrillia coccinata is a species of sea snail, a marine gastropod mollusk in the family Drilliidae.

Description
The shell grows to a length of 16 mm.

The whorls are smooth or obsoletely striate, concave around the upper part, plicately nodose on the periphery. The color of the shell is; pink-white, stained with rose-color between the nodules, and sometimes below them,
occasionally faintly banded with rose on the lower part of the body whorl.

Distribution
This species occurs in the Caribbean Sea off Colombia, the Lesser Antilles and off Puerto Rico.

References

 Reeve, L. 1845. Monograph of the genus Pleurotoma Conchologia Iconica 1 pls. 19–33 
 Smith, E. A. 1882. Diagnoses of new species of Pleurotomidae in the British Museum Annals and Magazine of Natural History (5)10 206–218. 
 M.M. Schepman, Full text of "Siboga expeditie" (as Drillia interpunctata)
 Melvill, J. C. 1923. Descriptions of twenty-one species of Turridae (Pleurotomidae) from various localities in the collection of Mr. E. R. Sykes Proceedings of the Malacological Society of London 15 162–171, pls. 4–5.
 Usticke, G. W. Nowell. 1969. A Supplementary Listing of New Shells, to be Added to the Check List of the Marine Shells of St. Croix  32 pp., 6 pls. Author: St. Croix.

External links
 
  Tucker, J.K. 2004 Catalog of recent and fossil turrids (Mollusca: Gastropoda). Zootaxa 682:1–1295.

coccinata
Gastropods described in 1845